Margary is a surname. Notable people with the surname include:

 Augustus Raymond Margary (1846–1875), British diplomat and explorer
 Ivan Margary (1896–1976), British historian of ancient Roman